Luhansk Oblast Football Federation (LOFF) is a football governing body in the region of Luhansk Oblast, Ukraine. The federation is a  collective member of the Football Federation of Ukraine.

Championship

1939    FC Voroshylovsk
1940-43 World War II
1944    FC Voroshylovsk (2)
1945    ???
1946    FC Stal Voroshylovsk
1947    FC Stal Voroshylovsk (2)
1948    FC Stal Voroshylovsk (3)
1949    ???
1950    ???
1951    ???
1952    ???
1953    FC Shakhtar Kadiivka
1954    ???
1955    FC Shakhtar Sverdlovsk
1956    FC Shakhtar Sverdlovsk (2)
1957    FC Avanhard Voroshylovhrad
1958    FC Khimik Sieverodonetsk
1959    FC Donsoda Lysychansk
1960    FC Avanhard Luhansk (2)
1961    FC Avanhard Sverdlovsk (3)
1962    FC Metalurh Komunarsk
1963    FC Zorya Luhansk (3)
1964    FC Avanhard Rovenky
1965    FC Shakhtar Lysychansk
1966    FC Avanhard Rovenky (2)
1967    FC Avanhard Rovenky (3)
1968    FC Shakhtar Kirovsk
1969    FC Shakhtar Lysychansk
1970    FC Shakhtar Lysychansk (2)
1971    FC Shakhtar Sverdlovsk (4)
1972    ???
1973    ???
1974    ???
1975    ???
1976    ???
1977    ???
1978    FC Khimik Sieverodonetsk (2)
1979    FC Khimik Sieverodonetsk (3)
1980    FC Khimik Rubizhne
1981    ???
1982    FC Shakhtar Sverdlovsk (5)
1983    FC Sokil Rovenky
1984    FC Komunarets Komunarsk
1985    FC Nyva Svatove
1986    FC Metalurh Lutuhine
1987    FC Khimik Sieverodonetsk (4)
1988    FC Bidivelnyk Komunarsk
1989    FC Sokil Rovenky (2)
1990    FC Antratsyt
1991    FC Dynamo Luhansk
1992(s) FC Dynamo Luhansk (2)
1992(f) FC Urozhai Troitske
1993(s) FC Metalurh Lutuhine
1993(f) FC Vahonobudivnyk-2 Stakhanov
1994    FC Hirnyk Bryanka
1995    FC Shakhtar Rovenky
1996    FC Shakhtar Krasnyi Luch
1997    FC Zolote-Almaz Pervomaisk
1998    FC Shakhtar Sverdlovsk (6)
1999    FC Ellada-Enerhiya Luhansk
2000    FC Ellada-Enerhiya Luhansk (2)
2001    FC Shakhtar Luhansk
2002    FC Shakhtar Sverdlovsk (7)
2003    FC Molniya Sieverodonetsk
2004    FC Ahata Luhansk
2005    FC Shakhtar Sverdlovsk (8)
2006    FC Shakhtar Sverdlovsk (9)
2007    FC Ahata Luhansk (2)
2008    FC Zolote-Almaz Pervomaisk (2)
2009    FC Lysychansk-Proletariy
2010    FC Popasna
2011    SC Zorya Luhansk
2012    FC Antratsyt (2)
2013    FC Melnikov Mine Lysychansk
2014    Russian invasion of Ukraine
2015    FC Melnikov Mine Lysychansk (2)
2016    FC Melnikov Mine Lysychansk (3)
2017    SC Zaria Rubizhne
2018    FC Skif Shulhynka
2019    FC Skif Shulhynka (2)

Top winners
 9 - FC Shakhtar (Avanhard) Sverdlovsk
 4 - FC Khimik Sieverodonetsk
 3 - 5 clubs (Stal V., Zorya L. (Avanhard V.), Avanhard R., Shakhtar L., Melnikov Mine)
 2 - 9 clubs
 1 - 19 clubs

Cup winners
1969    FC Krasnodonvuhillia Krasnodon

2008    FC Stal-2 Alchevsk
2009    FC Krasnodonvuhillia Krasnodon
2010    ???
2011    FC Hirnyk Rovenky
2012    SC Zorya Luhansk
2013    FC Khimik Sieverodonetsk
2014    Final between Melnikov Mine and FC Antratsyt never took place
2015    Russian invasion of Ukraine
2016    FC Melnikov Mine Lysychansk
2017

Donbas Championship
Along with the Luhansk Oblast football championship, some better teams from Luhansk Oblast were taking part in united Donbas Championship since 2012. Despite a short interruption from 2015 selected Luhansk Oblast teams continued to play in the Donbas Championship which was replaced the Donetsk Oblast championship for couple of years.
2012    USK Rubin Donetsk
2013    USK Rubin Donetsk
2014    Begin of the War in Donbass
2015    FC Slavkhlib Slovyansk
2016    FC Slavkhlib Slovyansk

LNR
After the beginning of the War in Donbass, the local separatists conducted their own competition.

Championship
2015    FC Zaria-Stal Luhansk
2016    FC Dalevets Luhansk
2017    FC Dalevets Luhansk
2018    FC Shakhter Sverdlovsk
2019    FC Zaria-Akademia Luhansk
2020    FC Gornyak Rovenki

Cup winners
2015    SC Zaria Luhansk
2016

Note: FC Shakhtar Sverdlovsk according to the press center of the club does not participate in the LNR competitions, while some media claim it so.

Professional clubs
 FC Zorya Luhansk (Dzerzhinets), 1939, 1964-
 FC Dynamo Luhansk, 1946-1949
 FC Shakhtar Stakhanov, 1948-1949, 1957-1968
 FC Trudovye Rezervy Luhansk, 1949, 1957-1963
 FC Khimik Severodonetsk, 1960-1968
 FC Stal Alchevsk (Metallurg, Kommunarets), 1963-1968
 FC Shakhter Krasnyi Luch, 1965-1968
 FC Shakhtar Sverdlovsk, 1968
 FC Avanhard Rovenky, 1968

See also
 FFU Council of Regions

References

External links
 All champions of Luhansk Oblast at the Luhansk Our Football portal
 Official website

Football in the regions of Ukraine
Football governing bodies in Ukraine
Sport in Luhansk Oblast